This is a list of airports in the Czech Republic, grouped by type and sorted by location.

Passenger statistics
Czech Republic's airports with number of passengers served in 2014 / 2015 years.

Airports

Railway connections
Since 2015, Ostrava Airport has had a railway connection. It is the only airport with a railway connection in the Czech Republic (via line S4), but there are plans to connect Prague Airport to the railway network.

See also
 Czech Air Force
 Transport in the Czech Republic
 List of airlines of the Czech Republic
 List of airports by ICAO code: L#LK – Czech Republic
 Wikipedia: Airline destination lists: Europe#Czech Republic

References

Sources
 Czech Ministry of Transport
 
 
  – includes IATA codes
  – ICAO codes
  – IATA and ICAO codes

Czech Republic
 
Airports
Czech Republic
Airports